This is a list of Estonian summer football transfers for the 2009 season. The window opened on 1 July 2009 and closed on 31 July 2009.

Meistriliiga

Flora

Kalju

Kuressaare

Levadia

Paide LM

Sillamäe Kalev

Tallinna Kalev

Tammeka

Trans

Tulevik

Esiliiga

Ajax Lasnamäe

Flora II

Flora Rakvere

Levadia II

Lootus

Tamme Auto

TJK Legion

Tulevik II

Vaprus

Warrior

II Liiga

Elva

See also
 2009 Meistriliiga
 2009 Esiliiga

References

Estonia
transfers
2009